The Roman Catholic Diocese of Campo Limpo is a diocese located in the city of Campo Limpo Paulista in the Ecclesiastical province of São Paulo in Brazil.

History
 15 March 1989: Established as Diocese of Campo Limpo from the Metropolitan Archdiocese of São Paulo

Leadership
 Bishops of Campo Limpo (Roman rite)
 Bishop Emílio Pignoli (15 March 1989 – 30 July 2008)
 Bishop Luiz Antônio Guedes (30 July 2008 – 14 September 2022)
 Bishop Valdir José de Castro, S.S.P. (14 September 2022 – present)

References

 GCatholic.org
 Catholic Hierarchy
 Diocese website (Portuguese)

Roman Catholic dioceses in Brazil
Christian organizations established in 1989
Dioceses established in the 20th century
Campo Limpo, Roman Catholic Diocese of
Roman Catholic dioceses and prelatures established in the 20th century